Robert F. Armstrong (June 11, 1920 – November 22, 2009) was an American professional basketball player. He played in the National Basketball League for the Youngstown Bears in just one game during the 1945–46 season but did not register a single statistic.

Armstrong was born in Cambridge, Ohio but was raised in Warren, Ohio. He played college basketball at Glenville State College in Glenville, West Virginia from 1938 to 1942. He was the sixth man in his freshman season of 1938–39 but then a starter his final three years. He earned All-WVIAC honors twice (1941, 1942). In 2008, he was inducted into Glenville State's Hall of Fame. Armstrong graduated in 1942 and went on to earn a master's degree from Kent State University.

Outside of Armstrong's one-game professional basketball career, he served the U.S. Army in World War II; was a middle- and high-school teacher as well as a high school track, baseball, and basketball coach; worked in insurance, and then owned a private business (TRW Title Insurance Co.) until his retirement in 1998. Armstrong died at McGraw Hospice Center in Jacksonville, Florida on November 22, 2009 at age 89.

References

1920 births
2009 deaths
American men's basketball players
United States Army personnel of World War II
Basketball players from Ohio
Forwards (basketball)
Glenville State Pioneers basketball players
High school baseball coaches in the United States
High school basketball coaches in the United States
Kent State University alumni
People from Cambridge, Ohio
Sportspeople from Warren, Ohio
Basketball players from Jacksonville, Florida
Sportspeople from Jacksonville, Florida
Youngstown Bears players